Buddleja davidii var. nanhoensis is endemic to Kansu, China, and introduced by Farrer in 1914. The taxonomy of the plant and the other five davidii varieties has been challenged in recent years. Leeuwenberg sank them all as synonyms, considering them to be within the natural variation of a species, a treatment adopted in the Flora of China published in 1996.

Description
Buddleja davidii var. nanhoensis is chiefly distinguished by its small size. Rarely growing to a height of > 1.5 m, the shrub has a more compact habit than the type, narrower leaves and shorter panicles.

Cultivation
Now very rare in cultivation, unlike its various 'Nanho' hybrid cultivars, the shrub is still grown in the UK at the Sir Harold Hillier Gardens near Romsey.

Suppliers
There are seven nurseries in the UK still raising the shrub listed in the RHS Plantfinder .

References

davidii
Flora of China